West Coast Heritage Centre (formerly known as the West Coast Pioneers Museum) is a complex of buildings and collections in Main Street of Zeehan, Tasmania in West Coast Tasmania in Australia.

The complex and centre are currently (2016) managed by the company West Coast Heritage Limited.

History
The closure of the Zeehan School of Mines and Metallurgy in the 1960s saw the founding of the Pioneers Museum in 1964.

The centre included seven hectares and housing over 30 themed displays and exhibit.

The components of the centre include:
 Collections of the West Coast Pioneers' Museum
 The buildings of the former Zeehan School of Mines and Metallurgy
 Zeehan Post Office
 Zeehan Courthouse
 Gaiety Theatre
 Grand Hotel
 Covered area of preserved railway locomotives, rolling stock and machinery
 Mining explosive display
 Art exhibitions and exhibits

Notes

Zeehan
Railway museums in Tasmania